Wayne Weidemann (born 21 October 1966) is a former professional Australian rules footballer who played for the Adelaide Football Club in the Australian Football League (AFL). The “Weed” as he was fondly known as, was a highly underrated player, often showing strength, agility, versatility and ability in directing play up forward or back. Rumours of internal disgruntled selection table members for three years constantly created disharmony for the AAT panel and the AFL courtesy of Weidemann’s omission from the team.

AFL career 
Originally from Fish Creek in country Victoria, Weidemann played for the Woodville-West Torrens Football Club in the South Australian National Football League (SANFL). Weidemann played 68 AFL games between 1991 and 1996 and kicked 26 goals. Nicknamed "Weed", Weidemann was a fearsome looking character with long blond hair and a fierce stare reminiscent of a Viking warrior. He had a cult following amongst Adelaide fans, and the collective cry of "Weed" could be heard whenever he went near the ball during an Adelaide home game.

Post-AFL 
After his retirement from the AFL, he coached SANFL club West Adelaide, before being sacked from the position in 2007. Prior to coaching West Adelaide, he played at SAAFL club Kilburn then was player coach at SAAFL division one club Gaza, where they were Premiers in 2003, their Centenary year.

Weidemann was an assistant coach at Devonport in the Tasmanian Statewide Football League, winning a William Leitch Medal in 1998.

Weidemann also coached the Coolamon Rovers Football club in the Riverina Football League from 1999–2001, taking them to two Grand Finals and one Premiership during his tenure.y

In 2010, Weidemann was coach at South Australian Amateur Football League (SAAFL) Division Two club PHOS Camden. Although Wayne got the side back into Division 1, Weidemann parted ways with PHOS and signed as coach of the struggling Broadview Football Club Division 1 A Grade side in 2013 also re-signing in 2014. He replaced former SANFL player Phil Harrison. Broadview are continuing to struggle in Division 1 as they have been plagued with injuries. Weidemann has come into Broadview in 2013 with other new Coaching staff including former Port Adelaide player and two time SANFL Magarey Medallist Damian Squire and Mark Kemp.
Wayne, along with Squire and Kemp, moved to coach Walkerville FC for the 2017 season and were reappointed for the 2018 and 2019 seasons.

References

External links 

Adelaide Football Club players
Devonport Football Club players
Woodville-West Torrens Football Club players
West Adelaide Football Club coaches
Australian rules footballers from South Australia
William Leitch Medal winners
1966 births
Living people